Glenhis Hernández (born 7 October 1990 in Havana) is a taekwondo practitioner from Cuba. She was the 2013 World Champion in middleweight.

2012 Olympics
Hernández won her preliminary round match against Wiam Dislam 2—1.  She beat Maryna Konieva 4—2 in the quarterfinals.  She lost to Anne-Caroline Graffe 4—6 in the semi-final of table A.  She lost again to Maria del Rosario Espinoza 2—4 in the contest for bronze medal B.

2013 World Championships
At the 2013 World Championships in Puebla, Hernández achieved the high point of her career by winning the gold medal. In the final match she beat her Korean opponent Lee In-jong 5–1.

See also
Taekwondo at the 2012 Summer Olympics – Women's +67 kg

References

External links

1990 births
Cuban female taekwondo practitioners
Living people
Sportspeople from Havana
Taekwondo practitioners at the 2012 Summer Olympics
Taekwondo practitioners at the 2011 Pan American Games
Olympic taekwondo practitioners of Cuba
Pan American Games gold medalists for Cuba
Pan American Games medalists in taekwondo
Central American and Caribbean Games silver medalists for Cuba
Competitors at the 2014 Central American and Caribbean Games
World Taekwondo Championships medalists
Central American and Caribbean Games medalists in taekwondo
Medalists at the 2011 Pan American Games
20th-century Cuban women
21st-century Cuban women